Bergenline Avenue is a station on the Hudson-Bergen Light Rail (HBLR). The intermodal facility is located on 49th Street between Bergenline Avenue and Kennedy Boulevard in Union City, New Jersey, near its border with West New York and North Bergen. The station is the first and only completely underground station on the network and opened for service on February 25, 2006.

Platform layout
Bergenline Avenue is the only stop on in the HBLR system with an underground platform. Located 160 feet below ridge of the Hudson Palisades in the former Weehawken Terminal tunnel of the West Shore Railroad, it is reached by elevators traveling from street-level entrances located just north of busbays. The station was designed by FXFOWLE Architects. The four porcelain enamel on steel murals which adorn the complex are entitled Between Manhattan and Meadowlands, and were created by Maria Mijares.

Vicinity

Bergenline Avenue is the main shopping district in North Hudson. Just over the city line it narrows from a two way thoroughfare to a narrower one way avenue heading south (with New York Avenue one block west used for northbound travel). The Bergenline Avenue Commercial Historic District, listed on the New Jersey Register of Historic Places, continues to 32nd Street. The Hudson County Community College maintains a location next to the station complex on Kennedy Boulevard, with Flower Hill Cemetery across the street.  Grove Church Cemetery and North Bergen Town Hall are few blocks south on the boulevard.

References

External links

 Bergenline Avenue entrance from Google Maps Street View
 Platform from Google Maps Street View

Hudson-Bergen Light Rail stations
Railway stations in Hudson County, New Jersey
Bus transportation in New Jersey
North Hudson, New Jersey
Transit hubs serving New Jersey
Railway stations in the United States opened in 2006
Railroad tunnels in New Jersey
Tunnels completed in 2006
Railway stations with vitreous enamel panels
2006 establishments in New Jersey
Railway stations located underground in New Jersey